The 2022–23 season is Fudbalski Klub Partizan's 76th season in existence and the club's 17th competing in the Serbian SuperLiga.

Transfers

In

Out

Players

Squad

Friendlies

Competitions

Overview

Serbian SuperLiga

Regular season

League table

Results by matchday

Results

Serbian Cup

UEFA Europa League

Third qualifying round

UEFA Europa Conference League

Play-off round

Group stage

Results

Knockout Phase

Knockout round play-offs

Statistics

Squad statistics

|-
! colspan=14 style="background:black; color:white; text-align:center;"| Goalkeepers

|-
! colspan=14 style="background:black; color:white; text-align:center;"| Defenders

|-
! colspan=14 style="background:black; color:white; text-align:center;"| Midfielders

|-
! colspan=14 style="background:black; color:white; text-align:center;"| Forwards

|-
! colspan=14 style="background:black; color:white; text-align:center;"| Players transferred out during the season

Goal scorers

Last updated: 17 March 2023

Clean sheets

Last updated: 12 March 2023

Disciplinary record

Last updated: 17 March 2023

Game as captain 

Last updated: 17 March 2023

References

FK Partizan seasons
Partizan
2022–23 UEFA Europa League participants seasons
2022–23 UEFA Europa Conference League participants seasons